Fântâni may refer to several villages in Romania:

 Fântâni, a village in Goiești Commune, Dolj County
 Fântâni, a village in Nicorești Commune, Galaţi County